The Opelousas Orphans, DeQuincy Railroaders and Port Arthur Refiners were a minor league baseball team that operated in 1932 in the Cotton States League. The team played the season in Opelousas, Louisiana, Dequincy, Louisiana  and Port Arthur, Texas.

References

Opelousas, Louisiana
Defunct Cotton States League teams
Baseball teams established in 1932
Baseball teams disestablished in 1932
Defunct minor league baseball teams
Professional baseball teams in Louisiana
1932 establishments in Louisiana
1932 disestablishments in Louisiana
Defunct baseball teams in Louisiana